AirTrain JFK is an  elevated people mover system and airport rail link serving John F. Kennedy International Airport (JFK Airport) in New York City. The driverless system operates 24/7 and consists of three lines and nine stations within the New York City borough of Queens. It connects the airport's terminals with the New York City Subway in Howard Beach, Queens, and with the Long Island Rail Road and the subway in Jamaica, Queens. Alstom operates AirTrain JFK under contract to the airport's operator, the Port Authority of New York and New Jersey.

A railroad link to JFK Airport was first recommended in 1968. Various plans surfaced to build a JFK Airport rail connection until the 1990s, though these were not carried out because of a lack of funding. The JFK Express subway service and shuttle buses provided an unpopular transport system to and around JFK. In-depth planning for a dedicated transport system at JFK began in 1990, but was ultimately cut back from a direct rail link to an intra-borough people mover. Construction of the current people-mover system began in 1998. During construction, AirTrain JFK was the subject of several lawsuits, and an operator died during one of the system's test runs. The system opened on December 17, 2003, after many delays. Several improvements were proposed after the system's opening, including an unbuilt extension to Manhattan. AirTrain JFK originally had ten stations, but the Terminal 2 stop was closed in 2022.

All passengers entering or exiting at either Jamaica or Howard Beach must pay a $8.25 fare, while passengers traveling within the airport can ride for free. The system was originally projected to carry 4 million annual paying passengers and 8.4 million annual inter-terminal passengers every year. The AirTrain has consistently exceeded these projections since opening.

History

Plan for direct rail connection 

The first proposal for a direct rail link to JFK Airport was made in the mid-1940s, when a rail line was proposed for the median of the Van Wyck Expressway, connecting Midtown Manhattan with the airport. New York City parks commissioner Robert Moses, at the time an influential urban planner in the New York City area, refused to consider the idea. In 1968, the Metropolitan Transportation Authority (MTA) suggested extending the Long Island Rail Road (LIRR) to the airport as part of the Program for Action, an ambitious transportation expansion program for the New York City area. Ultimately, the rail link was canceled altogether due to the New York City fiscal crisis of 1975. Another proposal, made by the Port Authority of New York and New Jersey in 1987, called for a rail line to connect all of JFK Airport's terminals with a new $500 million transportation center. The Port Authority withdrew its plans in 1990 after airlines objected that they could not fund the proposal.

In 1978, the MTA started operating the JFK Express, a premium-fare New York City Subway service that connected Midtown Manhattan to the Howard Beach–JFK Airport station. The route carried subway passengers to the Howard Beach station, where passengers would ride shuttle buses to the airport. The shuttle buses transported passengers between the different airport terminals within JFK's Central Terminal Area, as well as between Howard Beach and the terminals. The JFK Express service was unpopular with passengers because of its high cost, and because the buses often got stuck in traffic. The service was ultimately canceled in 1990.

During rush hour, the travel time from JFK to Manhattan could average up to 80 minutes by bus; during off-peak hours, a New York City taxi could make that journey in 45 minutes, while a bus could cover the same distance in an hour. The Port Authority, foreseeing economic growth for the New York City area and increased air traffic at JFK, began planning for a direct rail link from the airport to Manhattan. In 1991, the Port Authority introduced a Passenger Facility Charge (PFC), a $3 tax on every passenger departing from JFK, which would provide $120 million annually.

In 1990, the MTA proposed a $1.6 billion rail link to LaGuardia and JFK airports, which would be funded jointly by federal, state, and city government agencies. The rail line was to begin in Midtown Manhattan, crossing the East River into Queens via the Queensboro Bridge. It would travel to LaGuardia Airport, then make two additional stops at Shea Stadium and Jamaica before proceeding to JFK. After the Port Authority found that the ridership demand might not justify the cost of the rail link, the MTA downgraded the project's priority. The proposal was supported by governor Mario Cuomo and Queens borough president Claire Shulman. The transport advocacy group Regional Plan Association (RPA) called the plan "misguided", and the East Side Coalition on Airport Access's executive director said, "We are going to end up with another [...] uncompleted project in this city."

The Port Authority started reviewing blueprints for the JFK rail link in 1992. At the time, it was thought that the link could be partially open within six years.  In 1994, the Port Authority set aside $40 million for engineering and marketing of the new line, and created an environmental impact statement (EIS). The project's budget had grown to $2.6 billion by that year. The EIS, conducted by the New York State Department of Transportation and the Federal Aviation Administration (FAA), found the plan to be feasible, though the project attracted opposition from area residents and advocacy groups.

The project was to start in 1996, but there were disputes over where the Manhattan terminal should be located. The Port Authority had suggested the heavily trafficked corner of Lexington Avenue and 59th Street, though many nearby residents opposed the Manhattan terminal outright. The Port Authority did not consider a connection to the more-highly used Grand Central Terminal or Penn Station because such a connection would have been too expensive and complicated. To pay for the project, the Port Authority would charge a one-way ticket price of between $9 and $12. By February 1995, the cost of the planned link had increased to over $3 billion in the previous year alone. As a result, the Port Authority considered abridging the rail link plan, seeking federal and state funding, partnering with private investors, or terminating the line at a Queens subway station.

Curtailment of plan 
The direct rail connection between Manhattan, LaGuardia Airport, and JFK Airport was canceled outright in mid-1995. The plan had failed to become popular politically, as it would have involved increasing road tolls and PATH train fares to pay for the new link. In addition, the 1990s economic recession meant that there was little chance that the Port Authority could fund the project's rising price. Following the cancellation, the planned connection to JFK Airport was downsized to a  monorail or people mover, which would travel between Howard Beach and the JFK terminals. The Port Authority initially proposed building a $827 million monorail, similar to AirTrain Newark at Newark Airport, which would open the following year. In August 1995, the FAA approved the Port Authority's request to use the PFC funds for the monorail plan (the agency had already collected $114 million, and was planning to collect another $325 million). After the monorail was approved, the Port Authority hoped to begin construction in 1997 and open the line by 2002.

The Port Authority voted to proceed with the scaled-down system in 1996. Its final environmental impact statement (FEIS) for the JFK people mover, released in 1997, examined eight possibilities. Ultimately, the Port Authority opted for a light rail system with the qualities of a people mover, tentatively called the "JFK Light Rail System". It would replace the shuttle buses, running from the airport terminals to either Jamaica or Howard Beach. The FEIS determined that an automated system with frequent headways was the best design. Although there would not be a direct connection to Manhattan, the Port Authority estimated it would halve travel time between JFK and Midtown, with the journey between JFK and Penn Station taking one hour. According to The New York Times, in the 30 years between the first proposal and the approval of the light rail system, 21 recommendations for direct rail links to New York-area airports had been canceled.

While Governor Pataki supported the revised people-mover plan, Mayor Rudy Giuliani voiced his opposition on the grounds that the city would have to contribute $300 million, and that it was not a direct rail link from Manhattan, and thus would not be profitable because of the need to transfer from Jamaica. The Port Authority was originally planning to pay for only $1.2 billion of the project, and use the other $300 million to pay the rent at the airport instead. In order to give his agreement, Giuliani wanted the Port Authority to study extending the Astoria elevated to LaGuardia Airport, as well as making the light-rail system compatible with the subway or LIRR to allow possible future interoperability. He agreed to the plan in 1997 when the state agreed to reimburse the city for its share of the system's cost. As part of the agreement, the state would also conduct a study on a similar train link to LaGuardia Airport. By that time, the Port Authority had collected $441 million in PFC funds.

In 1999, the RPA published a report in which it recommended the construction of new lines and stations for the New York City Subway. The plan included one service that would travel from Grand Central Terminal to JFK Airport via the JFK Light Rail. Ultimately, the MTA rejected the RPA's proposal.

Construction 

The Port Authority could only use the funds from the Passenger Facility Charge to make improvements that exclusively benefited airport passengers. As a result, only the sections linking Jamaica and Howard Beach to JFK Airport were approved and built, since it was expected that airport travelers would be the sole users of the system. The federal government approved the use of PFC funds for the new light rail system in February 1998. Some $200 million of the project's cost was not eligible to be funded from the PFC tax because, according to the FAA, the tax funds could not be used to pay for "any costs resulting from an over-designed system", such as fare collection systems.

Construction of the system began in May 1998. Most of the system was built one span at a time, using cranes mounted on temporary structures that erected new spans as they progressed linearly along the structures. Several sections were built using a balanced cantilever design, where two separate spans were connected to each other using the span-by-span method. The Jamaica branch's location above the median of the busy Van Wyck Expressway, combined with the varying length and curves of the track spans, caused complications during construction. One lane of the Van Wyck had to be closed in each direction during off-peak hours, causing congestion. By the end of 1999, the columns in the Van Wyck's median were being erected. The project also included $80 million of tunnels within the airport, which was built using a cut-and-cover method. The water table was as shallow as  beneath the surface, so contractors pumped water out of the trench during construction.

The route ran mostly along existing rights-of-way, but three commercial properties were expropriated and demolished to make way for new infrastructure. Members of the New York City Planning Commission approved the condemnation of several buildings along the route in May 1999 but voiced concerns about the logistics of the project. These concerns included the projected high price of the tickets, ridership demand, and unwieldy transfers at Jamaica.

Though community leaders supported the project because of its connections to the Jamaica and Howard Beach stations, almost all the civic groups along the Jamaica branch's route opposed it due to concerns about nuisance, noise, and traffic. There were multiple protests against the project; during one such protest in 2000, a crane caught fire in a suspected arson. Homeowners in the vicinity believed the concrete supports would lower the value of their houses. Residents were also concerned about the noise that an elevated structure would create; according to a 2012 study, the majority of residents' complaints were due to "nuisance violations". The Port Authority responded to residents' concerns by imposing strict rules regarding disruptive or loud construction activity, as well as implementing a streamlined damage claim process to compensate homeowners. Through 2002, there were 550 nuisance complaints over the AirTrain's construction, of which 98 percent had been resolved by April of that year. Not all community boards saw a high level of complaints; Queens Community Board 12, which includes the neighborhood of South Jamaica along the AirTrain's route, recorded few complaints about the construction process.

The Air Transportation Association of America (ATA) filed a federal lawsuit in January 1999 alleging misuse of PFC funds. In March, a federal judge vacated the project's approval because the FAA had incorrectly continued to collect and make use of comments posted after the deadline for public comment, but found that the PFC funds had not been misused. The FAA opened a second request for public comment and received a second approval. In 2000, two local advocacy groups filed a second federal lawsuit, claiming that the FEIS had published misleading statements about the effects of the elevated structure on southern Queens neighborhoods. The ATA and the two advocacy groups appealed the funding decision. The ATA later withdrew from the lawsuit, but one of the advocacy groups proceeded with the appeal and lost.

By the time the appeal was decided in October 2000, two-thirds of the system's viaduct structures had been erected. Construction progressed quickly, and the system was ready for its first test trains by that December. In May 2001, a $75 million renovation of the Howard Beach station was completed; the rebuilt station contained an ADA-compliant transfer to and from the AirTrain. The same month, work started on a $387 million renovation of the Jamaica LIRR station, which entailed building a transfer passageway to the AirTrain. Though the Jamaica station's rehabilitation was originally supposed to be finished by 2005, it was not completed until September 2006. Two AirTrain cars were delivered and tested after the system's guideway rails were complete by March 2001. The guideways themselves, between the rails, were completed in August 2001.

Opening and effects 

The Port Authority predicted that the AirTrain's opening would create 118 jobs at JFK Airport. Service was originally planned to begin on the Howard Beach branch in October 2002, followed by the Jamaica branch in 2003, but was delayed because of several incidents during testing. In July 2002, three workers were injured during an AirTrain derailment, and in September 2002, a train operator died in another derailment. The National Transportation Safety Board's investigation of the second crash found that the train had sped excessively on a curve. As a result, the opening was postponed until June 2003, and then to December 17, 2003, its eventual opening date.

Southeast Queens residents feared the project could become a boondoggle, as the construction cost of the system had increased to $1.9 billion. Like other Port Authority properties, the AirTrain did not receive subsidies from the state or city for its operating costs. This was one of the reasons cited for the system's relatively high initial $5 fare, which was more than twice the subway's fare at the time of the AirTrain's opening.

Several projects were developed in anticipation of the AirTrain. Other nearby projects built in the preceding five years included the Jamaica Center Mall, Joseph P. Addabbo Federal Building, the Civil Court, and a Food and Drug Administration laboratory and offices. After AirTrain JFK began operations, Jamaica saw a boom in commerce. A 15-screen movie theater opened in the area in early 2004, and developers were also planning a 13-floor building in the area. A proposed hotel above the AirTrain terminal was canceled after the September 11, 2001, terrorist attacks.

In 2004, the city proposed rezoning 40 blocks of Jamaica, centered around the AirTrain station, as a commercial area. According to the RPA, the rezoning was part of a proposal to re-envision Jamaica as a "regional center" because of the area's high usage as a transit hub. During the average weekday, 100,000 LIRR riders and 53,000 subway riders traveled to or from Jamaica. In addition, the Port Authority had estimated that the AirTrain JFK would carry 12.4 million passengers a year.

Plans to extend the AirTrain to Manhattan were examined even before the system's opening. Between September 2003 and April 2004, several agencies, including the MTA and the Port Authority, conducted a feasibility study of the Lower Manhattan–Jamaica/JFK Transportation Project, which would allow trains to travel directly from JFK Airport to Manhattan. The study examined 40 alternatives, but the project was halted in 2008 before an environmental impact statement could be created.

Renovation of JFK Airport 
On January 4, 2017, the office of New York Governor Andrew Cuomo announced a $7–10 billion plan to renovate JFK Airport. As part of the project, the AirTrain JFK would either see lengthened trainsets or a direct track connection to the rest of New York City's transportation system, and a direct connection between the AirTrain, LIRR, and subway would be built at Jamaica station. Shortly after Cuomo's announcement, the Regional Plan Association published an unrelated study for a possible direct rail link between Manhattan and JFK Airport. Yet another study in September 2018, published by the MTA, examined alternatives for an LIRR rail link to JFK as part of a possible restoration of the abandoned Rockaway Beach Branch.

In July 2017, Cuomo's office began accepting submissions for master plans to renovate the airport. A year later, in October 2018, Cuomo released details of the project, whose cost had grown to $13 billion. The improvements included lengthening AirTrains as well as adding lanes to the Van Wyck Expressway. The Terminal 2 station was closed on July 11, 2022, due to construction at JFK Airport and demolished shortly thereafter.

System

Routes 

AirTrain JFK connects the airport's terminals and parking areas with the Howard Beach and Jamaica stations. It runs entirely within the New York City borough of Queens. The system consists of three routes: two connecting the terminals with either the Howard Beach or Jamaica stations, and one route looping continuously around the central terminal area. It is operated by Alstom (which purchased Bombardier in 2021) under contract to the Port Authority.

The Howard Beach Train route (colored green on the official map) begins and ends at the Howard Beach–JFK Airport station, where there is a direct transfer to the New York City Subway's . It makes an additional stop at Lefferts Boulevard, where passengers can transfer to parking lot shuttle buses; the Q3 bus to Jamaica; the B15 bus to Brooklyn; and the limited-stop Q10 bus.

The Jamaica Train route (colored red on the official map) begins and ends at the Jamaica station, adjacent to the Long Island Rail Road platforms there. The Jamaica station contains a connection to the Sutphin Boulevard–Archer Avenue–JFK Airport station on the New York City Subway's . The AirTrain and LIRR stations contain transfers to the subway, as well as to ground-level bus routes. West of Jamaica, the line travels above the north side of 94th Avenue before curving southward onto the Van Wyck Expressway.

The Howard Beach Train and Jamaica Train routes merge at Federal Circle for car rental companies and shuttle buses to hotels and the airport's cargo areas. Both routes continue counterclockwise around the loop, stopping at Terminals 1, 4, 5, 7, and 8 in that order. A connection to the Q3 local bus is available at Terminal 8. The travel time from either Jamaica or Howard Beach to the JFK terminals is about eight minutes.

The Airport Terminals Loop (colored gold on the official map), an airport terminal circulator, serves the terminals. It makes a continuous clockwise loop around the terminals, operating in the opposite direction to the Howard Beach Train and Jamaica Train routes.

Trains to and from Jamaica and Howard Beach were originally planned to run every two minutes during peak hours, with alternate trains traveling to each branch. The final environmental impact statement projected that trains in the central terminal area would run every ninety seconds. By 2014 actual frequencies were much lower: each branch was served by one train every seven to 12 minutes during peak hours. Trains arrived every 10 to 15 minutes on each branch during weekdays; every 15 to 20 minutes during late nights; and every 16 minutes during weekends.

Stations 

All AirTrain JFK stations contain elevators and are compliant with the Americans with Disabilities Act of 1990 (ADA). The stations include air conditioning, as well as platform screen doors to protect passengers and to allow the unmanned trains to operate safely. Each station also contains safety systems such as CCTV cameras, alarms, and emergency contact points, and is staffed by attendants.

All the stations have island platforms except for Federal Circle, which has a bi-level split platform layout. The Jamaica and Howard Beach stations are designed as "gateway stations" to give passengers the impression of entering the airport. There are also stations at Lefferts Boulevard, as well as Terminals 1, 4, 5, 7, and 8.  Three former terminals, numbered 3, 6, and 9, were respectively served by the stations that were later renamed Terminals 2, 5, and 8.  The four stations outside the Central Terminal Area were originally designated with the letters A–D alongside their names; the letters were later dropped. After Terminal 2 station closed in 2022, Terminal 1 station temporarily served passengers for both terminals until the closure of Terminal 2 in January 2023.

The Jamaica station was designed by Voorsanger Architects, and Robert Davidson of the Port Authority's in-house architecture department designed the Howard Beach station. Most stations in the airport are freestanding structures connected to their respective terminal buildings by an aerial walkway, except for Terminal 4 station, which is inside the terminal building itself.

Tracks and infrastructure 

AirTrain JFK is mostly elevated, though there are short segments that run underground or at ground level. The elevated sections were built with precast single and dual guideway spans, the underground sections used cut-and-cover, and the ground-level sections used concrete ties and ballast trackbeds. The elevated structures use seismic isolation bearings and soundproof barriers to protect from small earthquakes as well as prevent noise pollution. AirTrain JFK's tunnels, all within the airport, pass beneath two taxiways and several highway ramps.

The AirTrain runs on steel tracks that are continuously welded across all joints except at the terminals; the guideway viaducts are also continuously joined. Trains use double crossovers at the Jamaica and Howard Beach terminals in order to switch to the track going in the opposite direction. There are also crossover switches north and south of Federal Circle, counterclockwise from Terminal 8, and clockwise from Terminal 1.

This enables possible future conversion to LIRR or subway use, or a possible connection to LIRR or subway tracks for a one-trip ride into Manhattan, since these systems use the same track gauge. AirTrain's current rolling stock, or train cars, are not able to use either LIRR or subway tracks due to the cars' inadequate structural strength and the different methods of propulsion used on each system. In particular, the linear induction motor system that propels the AirTrain vehicles is incompatible with the traction motor manual-propulsion system used by LIRR and subway rolling stock. If a one-seat ride is ever implemented, a hybrid-use vehicle would be needed to operate on both subway/LIRR and AirTrain tracks.

There are seven electrical substations. The redundancy allows trains to operate even if there are power outages at one substation. Since there are no emergency exits between stations, a control tower can automatically guide the train to its next stop in case of an emergency.

Fares 

AirTrain JFK is free to use for travel within the terminal area, as well as at the Lefferts Boulevard station, which is next to the long-term parking, and at the Federal Circle station, where there are shuttle buses to hotels and car rental companies. Passengers entering or leaving the system at the Jamaica or Howard Beach stations must pay using MetroCard. AirTrain JFK does not accept payment with the OMNY fare-payment system used on the New York City Subway and city buses, nor does it accept any other forms of payment, such as cash. , JFK Airport indicated that OMNY would not be implemented on AirTrain JFK until 2024.

AirTrain JFK charges for $8.25 for transiting through either the Jamaica or Howard Beach faregates. MetroCard vending machines are located on both sides of the faregates at each station, and a $1 fee is charged to purchase a MetroCard. In addition to single ride fares, machines also sell passes for AirTrain JFK . A 30-Day AirTrain JFK MetroCard can be purchased for $40 and used for unlimited rides for 30 days after first use. A 10-Trip AirTrain JFK MetroCard is $25 and can be used for ten trips on the AirTrain within 31 days from first use.

There are no free transfers between AirTrain JFK and connecting transit services. For passengers transferring to local buses or the subway, an additional $2.75 fare is charged, and may be paid with MetroCard. Patrons transferring to a Manhattan-bound LIRR train at Jamaica pay an additional $10.75 during peak hours or $5 during off-peak hours and weekends, using the railroad's CityTicket program.

The fare to enter or exit at Howard Beach and Jamaica was originally $5, though preliminary plans included a discounted fare of $2 for airport and airline employees. In June 2019, the Port Authority proposed raising AirTrain JFK's fare to $7.75, and the fare increase was approved that September. The new fares took effect on November 1, 2019, representing the first fare raise in the system's history. In November 2021, the Port Authority discussed plans to raise the fare a second time, to $8; this fare increase took effect on March 1, 2022. The fare was increased once more to $8.25 on March 5, 2023.

Rolling stock 

AirTrain JFK uses Innovia Metro ART 200 rolling stock and technology. Similar systems are used on the SkyTrain in Vancouver, the Everline in Yongin, and the Kelana Jaya Line in Kuala Lumpur. The computerized trains are fully automated and use a communications-based train control system with moving block signals to dynamically determine the locations of the trains. AirTrain JFK is a wholly driverless system, and it uses SelTrac train-signaling technology manufactured by Thales Group. Trains are operated from and maintained at a  train yard between Lefferts Boulevard and Federal Circle, atop a former employee parking lot. The system originally used pre-recorded announcements by New York City traffic reporter Bernie Wagenblast, a longtime employee of the Port Authority.

The 32 individual, non-articulated Mark II vehicles operating on the line draw power from a 750 V DC top-running third rail. A linear induction motor pushes magnetically against an aluminum strip in the center of the track. The vehicles also have steerable trucks that can navigate sharp curves and steep grades, as well as align precisely with the platform doors at the stations.

Trains can run in either direction and can consist of between one and four cars. An individual car has 26 seats and can carry up to 97 passengers with luggage, or 205 without luggage. Because most passengers carry luggage, the actual operating capacity is between 75 and 78 passengers per car.

Ridership 
When AirTrain JFK was being planned, it was expected that 11,000 passengers per day would pay to ride the system between the airport and either Howard Beach or Jamaica, and that 23,000 more daily passengers would use the AirTrain to travel between terminals. This would amount to about 4 million paying passengers and 8.4 million in-airport passengers per year. According to the FEIS, the system could accommodate over 3,000 daily riders from Manhattan, and its opening would result in approximately 75,000 fewer vehicle miles ( kilometers) being driven each day.

During the first month of service, an average of 15,000 passengers rode the system each day. Though this figure was less than the expected daily ridership of 34,000, the AirTrain JFK had become the second-busiest airport transportation system in the United States. Within its first six months, AirTrain JFK had transported one million riders.

In the decade after the AirTrain opened, it consistently experienced year-over-year ridership growth. A New York Times article in 2009 observed that one possible factor in the AirTrain's increasing ridership was the $7.75 fare for AirTrain and subway, which was cheaper than the $52 taxi ride between Manhattan and JFK.  In 2019, there were 8.7 million passengers who paid to travel between JFK Airport and either Howard Beach or Jamaica. This represented an increase of more than 300 percent from the 2.6 million riders who paid during the first full year of operation, 2004. An additional 12.2 million people were estimated to have ridden the AirTrain for free in 2019, placing total annual ridership at 20.9 million. Amid a decline in air travel caused by the COVID-19 pandemic, the AirTrain had 3.4 million total riders in 2021.

See also 
 AirTrain LaGuardia, a canceled system that would have been built for LaGuardia Airport
 AirTrain Newark, a similar system at Newark Liberty International Airport
 List of airport circulators

References

Citations

Sources

External links 

 
 

2003 establishments in New York City
750 V DC railway electrification
Airport people mover systems in the United States
Airport rail links in the United States
ART people movers
Aviation in New York City
Electric railways in New York (state)
John F. Kennedy International Airport
Passenger rail transport in New York City
 
Railroads on Long Island
Railway lines opened in 2003
Rapid transit in New York (state)